Camden, an electoral district of the Legislative Assembly in the Australian state of New South Wales, has had two incarnations, from 1859 to 1920 and from 1981.


Election results

Elections in the 2010s

2019

2015

2011

Elections in the 2000s

2007

2003

Elections in the 1990s

1999

1995

1991

Elections in the 1980s

1988

1984

1981

1920 - 1981
District abolished

Elections in the 1910s

1917
This section is an excerpt from 1917 New South Wales state election § Camden

1913

1910
This section is an excerpt from 1910 New South Wales state election § Camden

Elections in the 1900s

1907
This section is an excerpt from 1907 New South Wales state election § Camden

1904
This section is an excerpt from 1904 New South Wales state election § Camden

1901
This section is an excerpt from 1901 New South Wales state election § Camden

Elections in the 1890s

1898
This section is an excerpt from 1898 New South Wales colonial election § Camden

1895
This section is an excerpt from 1895 New South Wales colonial election § Camden

1894
This section is an excerpt from 1894 New South Wales colonial election § Camden

1891
This section is an excerpt from 1891 New South Wales colonial election § Camden

Elections in the 1880s

1889
This section is an excerpt from 1889 New South Wales colonial election § Camden

1887
This section is an excerpt from 1887 New South Wales colonial election § Camden

1885
This section is an excerpt from 1885 New South Wales colonial election § Camden

1882
This section is an excerpt from 1882 New South Wales colonial election § Camden

1880
This section is an excerpt from 1880 New South Wales colonial election § Camden

Elections in the 1870s

1877
This section is an excerpt from 1877 New South Wales colonial election § Camden

1874-75
This section is an excerpt from 1874-75 New South Wales colonial election § Camden

1872
This section is an excerpt from 1872 New South Wales colonial election § Camden

Elections in the 1860s

1869-70
This section is an excerpt from 1869-70 New South Wales colonial election § Camden

1864-65
This section is an excerpt from 1864–65 New South Wales colonial election § Camden

1861 by-election

1860
This section is an excerpt from 1860 New South Wales colonial election § Camden

Elections in the 1850s

1859
This section is an excerpt from 1859 New South Wales colonial election § Camden

References

New South Wales state electoral results by district